Frank Howarth may refer to:
 Frank Howarth (public servant)
 Frank Howarth (woodworker)